David Bollier is an American activist, writer, and blogger who is focused on the commons as a paradigm for re-imagining economics, politics, and culture. He is a director of the Reinventing the Commons Program at the Schumacher Center for a New Economics, and is co-founder of the Commons Strategies Group, an international advocacy project.

Biography 
Bollier was founding editor of On the Commons (2003-2010), and now blogs at his own website. Bollier calls his work “exploring the commons as a new paradigm of economics, politics and culture.”

Bollier co-founded the Public Knowledge group in 2002 and served as a board member until 2010. He was awarded the 2012 Bosch Berlin Prize in Public Policy at the American Academy in Berlin. He collaborated with television writer/producer Norman Lear from 1985 to 2010 on political and public affairs projects, and worked with Ralph Nader in the late 1970s and early 1980s. He lives in Amherst, Massachusetts.

Books 
The Commoner's Catalog for Changemaking: Tools for the Transitions Ahead (Schumacher Center for a New Economics, 2021)
The Great Awakening: New Modes of Life Amidst Capitalist Ruins, (with co-editor Anna Grear) (Punctum Books, 2020)
Free, Fair and Alive: The Insurgent Power of the Commons (with co-author Silke Helfrich) (New Society Publishers, 2019)
Patterns of Commoning (with co-author Silke Helfrich) (Off the Common Books, 2015)
From Bitcoin to Burning Man and Beyond: The Quest for Identity and Autonomy in a Digital Society (with co-editor John H. Clippinger) (ID3 and Off the Common Books, 2014)
Think Like a Commoner:  A Short Introduction to the Life of the Commons" (New Society Publishers), 2014) 
Green Governance:  Ecological Survival, Human Rights and the Law of the Commons" (with co-author Burns H. Weston) (Cambridge University Press), 2012) 
The Wealth of the Commons:  A World Beyond Market and State" (with co-editor Silke Helfrich) (Levellers Press, 2012) 
Viral Spiral: How the Commoners Built a Digital Republic of Their Own (New Press, 2009) 
Ready to Share: Fashion and the Ownership of Creativity (Lear Center Press, 2006)
Brand Name Bullies: The Quest to Own and Control Culture (John Wiley & Sons, 2005) 
Sophisticated Sabotage: The Intellectual Games Used to Subvert Responsible Regulation (with Thomas McGarity and Sidney Shapiro; Environmental Law Institute, 2004)
Artists, Technology and the Ownership of Creative Content (Norman Lear Center, 2003)
Silent Theft: The Private Plunder of Our Common Wealth (Routledge, 2002)  
Aiming Higher: 25 Stories of How Companies Prosper by Combining Sound Management and Social Vision. (AMACOM, 1996)
The Great Hartford Circus Fire: Creative Settlement of Mass Disasters (Yale University Press, 1991)
Crusaders & Criminals, Victims & Visionaries: Historic Encounters Between Connecticut Citizens and the United States Supreme Court (Connecticut Attorney General, 1986)

References

External links 

 Personal site
 Commons Strategies Group
 On the Commons
 

Year of birth missing (living people)
Living people
Open content activists
American political writers